The Victoria Titans (known in its final two seasons as the Victoria Giants), were an Australian professional basketball team that competed in the National Basketball League (NBL). The club was based in Melbourne, Victoria.

History
The Titans were founded as a merger between the South East Melbourne Magic and North Melbourne Giants and competed in the National Basketball League (NBL) between the 1998–99 season and the 2003–04 season, and played their home games at Melbourne Park (1998–2000) and Vodafone Arena (2000–2002) when branded as the Titans. As the Giants the team played their games at the Melbourne Sports and Aquatic Centre (2002–2004).

Under the Titans name, the team competed in back-to-back NBL Grand Finals in 1999 and 2000, losing to the Adelaide 36ers and Perth Wildcats respectively. After the Titans folded in mid-2002, a group fronted by businessman Peter Fiddes was granted a licence in their place and called the new team the Giants. The club struggled financially for one season before being propped up by Gerry Ryan for the 2003–04 season. Ryan and co-owner Sandy Constantine pulled the team out of the league in 2004, but retained the licence despite the NBL's attempts to take it back.

Season by season

Honour roll

References

External links
 NBL official website

Basketball teams in Melbourne
Defunct National Basketball League (Australia) teams
Basketball teams established in 1998
Basketball teams disestablished in 2004
1998 establishments in Australia
2004 disestablishments in Australia